Cyberpathology refers to the phenomena that "individuals can become overly attached to their computers, computer games, or the Internet and spend inordinate amounts of time in front of their monitors". It may cause physical and psychological damages to the individual, for examples, insufficient amount of sleep, limited face-to-face interactions, and impacting on daily life activities.

Cyberpathology shares many of the same core symptoms of behavioral addictions, such as salience, mood modification, tolerance, withdrawal symptoms, conflict, and relapse.

Disorder categories

1. Computer and internet addiction
 Cybersex
 Online gambling
 Online auctions
 Online communications/Computer-mediated communication

2. Computer anxiety
In contrast to computer and Internet addiction, computer anxiety refers to "a state of heightened tension or a feeling of apprehensive expectation". Behavioral presentations of computer anxiety include: "(1) avoidance of computers and the general areas where computers are located; (2) excessive caution with computers; (3) negative remarks about computers; and (4) attempts to cut short the necessary use of computers". Computer anxiety is mainly assessed by self-report scales using Likert-type formats.

Age, gender, and computer experience are thought to be associated with computer anxiety. A meta-analysis based on studies published between 1990 and 1996 found that: (1) female university undergraduates are generally more anxious than male undergraduates, but the strength of this relationship is not conclusive; (2) instruments measuring computer anxiety are generally reliable, but not compatible with one another; and (3) computer anxiety is inversely related to computer experience, but the strength of this relationship remains inconclusive. However, Bozionelos found that the youngest sample with the presumably earliest exposure to computerization reported the highest computer anxiety scores and demonstrated the highest prevalence rates. Also, Wilfong found that computer experience did not have the largest significant relationship with computer anxiety.

3. Cybergenic stress syndrome
It is defined by Norman as "that constellation of interrelated emotional, physiological, and behavioral signs and symptoms that accompany frustration, irritation, and hostility which, although provoked by interaction with computer hardware, software, network, and related 'help' systems, results in aggression toward people or organizations to the ultimate detriment of the person affected."

4. Computer anger/rage
Computer anger is defined by Wilfong (2006, p. 1003) as "strong feelings of displeasure and negative cognitions in response to a perceived failure to perform a computer task." A similar term is computer rage, which is defined by Norman as "the physical bashing and verbal abuse of a computer or computer-related item." Wilfong (2006) found that computer self-efficacy beliefs had the largest significant relationship with both computer anxiety and anger. Likert-type scales can be used to measure computer anger.

Online help
Individuals with symptoms of cyberpathology could turn to a computer for psychological help. There are large amounts of mental health information available online. And the number is growing dramatically with time. However, the information varies greatly in reliability.

Psychologists also looked into the possibility of conducting psychotherapy online (e.g., Christensen, Griffiths, & Jorm, 2004, Griffiths, 2005, and Mallen, 2005).

Offline help
Group therapy could be used to help individuals with symptoms of cyberpathology. Family supports are also important in helping those individuals.

See also
 Behavioral addiction
 Digital addict
 Video game addiction

References

Computing culture